is a private university in Hatsukaichi, Hiroshima, Japan, established in 2000.

Academics

Undergraduate school 
 Faculty of Nursing (with the start of a four-year curriculum in 2000)

Graduate school 
 Masterʼs Program in Nursing (Master's program was started in 2004)

Affiliates 
 Japanese Red Cross Hokkaido College of Nursing
 The Japanese Red Cross Akita College of Nursing
 The Japanese Red Cross College of Akita
 Japanese Red Cross College of Nursing
 Japanese Red Cross Toyota College of Nursing
 The Japanese Red Cross Kyushu International College of Nursing

See also
List of universities in Japan

External links
 Official website 

Educational institutions established in 2000
Private universities and colleges in Japan
Universities and colleges in Hiroshima Prefecture
Nursing schools in Japan
2000 establishments in Japan
Hatsukaichi, Hiroshima